The Sumatran expeditions can refer to:
The First Sumatran expedition – An American expedition to the island in 1832, as redress for the taking of the massacre of the crew of the merchantman Friendship
The Second Sumatran expedition – An American expedition to the island in 1838, as redress for the massacre of the merchantman Eclipse